William Quevedo (born 8 May 1971) is a former French football player.

Club career
He played 5 seasons and 69 games in the Primeira Liga for Boavista.

Honours
Boavista
Primeira Liga: 2000–01
Supertaça Cândido de Oliveira: 1997

References

External links
 

1971 births
Footballers from Montpellier
Living people
French footballers
Rodez AF players
ASOA Valence players
Moreirense F.C. players
French expatriate footballers
Expatriate footballers in Portugal
Boavista F.C. players
FC Sochaux-Montbéliard players
FC Sète 34 players
Primeira Liga players
Liga Portugal 2 players
Ligue 1 players
Ligue 2 players
Championnat National players
Championnat National 2 players
Association football defenders
Association football midfielders